Calvin is a city in Cavalier County, North Dakota, United States. The population was 15 at the 2020 census. Calvin was founded in 1905.

Likely the most historic structure left in town, the Calvin AF & AM Corinthian Masonic Lodge Number 78, was burned and razed in May 2014, after the upper floor had collapsed sometime between 2010 and 2012.

Geography
Calvin is located at  (48.851162, -98.937397).

Demographics

2010 census
As of the census of 2010, there were 20 people, 8 households, and 3 families residing in the city. The racial makeup of the city was 100.0% White.

There were 8 households, of which 25.0% had children under the age of 18 living with them, 37.5% were married couples living together, and 62.5% were non-families. 62.5% of all households were made up of individuals, and 25% had someone living alone who was 65 years of age or older. The average household size was 2.50 and the average family size was 5.00.

The median age in the city was 48.7 years. 25% of residents were under the age of 18; 10% were between the ages of 18 and 24; 0.0% were from 25 to 44; 50% were from 45 to 64; and 15% were 65 years of age or older. The gender makeup of the city was 60.0% male and 40.0% female.

2000 census
As of the census of 2000, there were 26 people, 11 households, and 6 families residing in the city. The population density was 119.3 people per square mile (45.6/km2). There were 19 housing units at an average density of 87.2 per square mile (33.3/km2). The racial makeup of the city was 100.00% White.

There were 11 households, out of which 27.3% had children under the age of 18 living with them, 54.5% were married couples living together, 9.1% had a female householder with no husband present, and 36.4% were non-families. 36.4% of all households were made up of individuals, and 9.1% had someone living alone who was 65 years of age or older. The average household size was 2.36 and the average family size was 3.14.

In the city, the population was spread out, with 30.8% under the age of 18, 23.1% from 25 to 44, 30.8% from 45 to 64, and 15.4% who were 65 years of age or older. The median age was 44 years. For every 100 females, there were 188.9 males. For every 100 females age 18 and over, there were 157.1 males.

The median income for a household in the city was $31,667, and the median income for a family was $81,250. Males had a median income of $21,250 versus $56,250 for females. The per capita income for the city was $27,878. None of the population and none of the families were below the poverty line.

References

Cities in Cavalier County, North Dakota
Cities in North Dakota
Populated places established in 1905
1905 establishments in North Dakota